Franklin Clarence Mars (September 24, 1883 – April 8, 1935) was an American business magnate who founded the food company Mars, Incorporated, which mostly makes chocolate candy. Mars' son Forrest Edward Mars developed M&M's and the Mars bar.

Family
Franklin Mars was born in September 1883 in Minnesota. He learned how to hand-dip chocolate candy as a child from his mother Alva, who entertained him while he had a mild case of polio. He began to sell molasses chips at age 19.

Mars and Ethel G. Kissack (1882–1980), a schoolteacher, were married in 1902 in Hennepin County, Minnesota. Their son, Forrest Mars, Sr., was born in 1904 in Wadena, Minnesota.  They divorced.

Mars and Ethel Veronica Healy (1884–1945) were married in 1910 and had one daughter, Patricia Mars (1914–1965).

Mars, Incorporated
He started the Mars Candy Factory in 1911 with Ethel V. Mars, his second wife, in Tacoma, Washington. This factory produced and sold fresh candy wholesale, but ultimately the venture failed because there was a better established business, Brown & Haley, also operating in Tacoma.

In 1920, they moved to Minneapolis, Minnesota, where Mars founded Mar-O-Bar Co. and began to manufacture chocolate candy bars. The company later incorporated as Mars, Incorporated. In 1923 he introduced his son Forrest's idea, the Milky Way, which became the best-selling candy bar. Mars moved to Chicago  in 1929 and settled in River Forest. He became an honorary captain of the Oak Park, Illinois police department.

In 1930, Mars developed the Snickers Bar.

Death and legacy
Mars died from heart and kidney issues on April 8, 1935 at Johns Hopkins Hospital in Baltimore. Ownership of the family business passed to his son Forrest.

Horse racing

In the late 1920s, in Pulaski, Tennessee, Mars bought a number of local farms and constructed a large estate called Milky Way Farm. During its construction, Mars employed more than 935 men from Giles County to build a 25,000 square feet (2,300 m²) clubhouse, more than 30 barns, and a horse racing track. Gallahadion won the Kentucky Derby in 1940 after Mars died.

Mars lived the remainder of his life on the 2,800 acre (11 km²) farm and was buried there upon his death in 1934. After Milky Way Farm was sold, the remains of Mars and his wife Ethel V. Mars were moved to a private mausoleum at Lakewood Cemetery in Minneapolis, where they are currently interred.

See also
 Mars family

References

www.MilkyWayFarms.com

1883 births
1934 deaths
People from Stevens County, Minnesota
American food company founders
Businesspeople in confectionery
Chocolatiers
People from Oak Park, Illinois
People from Pulaski, Tennessee
Mars family
People with polio
Burials at Lakewood Cemetery